Gillian Alexy is an Australian actress. She is best known for her roles as Tayler Geddes on McLeod's Daughters, Gitta Novak on Damages, and G'Winveer Farrell on Outsiders.

Early life
Alexy graduated from the John Curtin College of the Arts in 2000, after doing specialist dance and theatre courses. Afterwards, she went to The Actors College in London, Le Centre des Arts Vivants and The Peter Goss Dance Studio in Paris, and earned a six-month theatre degree at the University of Colorado at Boulder (United States).

Career
Alexy began her acting career at the age of ten, making her debut in television series Bush Patrol. The following year she appeared in her first leading television role, the children's series The Gift, for which she played the part for the complete first and only season. Her second leading role was in the series Parallax, another television series which was cancelled after just one season. She gained notability for her role as Tayler Geddes on Logie Award-winning television series McLeod's Daughters; she first appeared at the end of season 6, in which her character came to Drovers Run to get revenge on Regan McLeod, whom she held responsible for the death of her father.

Alexy's other television credits include Fast Tracks, All Saints, The Strip, Packed to the Rafters. In 2011, she began appearing on American television, in the series' Law & Order: Special Victims Unit and Blue Bloods. She starred in the Australian film West in 2007, playing a supporting role opposite Khan Chittenden and Nathan Phillips.

Alexy took part in a back door pilot for the proposed TV series NCIS:Red in early 2013, the cast of which appeared in the spin-off debut double-episodes of NCIS: Los Angeles "Red, Part 1" and "Red, Part 2" in March that year. The series was ultimately not picked up by the network.

Filmography

Film

Television

Theatre
 Popcorn (1999)
 Return to the Forbidden Planet (2000)
 Mice (2001)
 Resident Alien (2002)
 Six Characters Looking for an Author (2003)
 Ghost Train (2004)
 The Chatroom (2004)
 Codes of Practice (2005)

References

External links
 
 Gillian Alexy biography at Perth Theatre Company

Australian television actresses
Australian film actresses
Australian child actresses
Actors from Perth, Western Australia
Living people
20th-century Australian actresses
21st-century Australian actresses